Froggattisca testacea is a species of cave-dwelling antlion (or Myrmeleontidae), endemic to the Northern Territory. 

The species was first described as Adeloplectron testaceum in 1923 by Peter Esben-Petersen, but was transferred to the genus, Froggattisca by Lionel Alvin Stange in 1976. 

Miller and Stange describe this species (and all Froggattisca species) as not being a true cave-dwelling antlion, because  not all life stages are confined to caves. The larvae of this species live in "recessed, slightly rain-protected abandoned termite galleries of termite mounds".

References

Myrmeleontidae
Insects described in 1923